The 2006–07 Montenegrin First League season was the inaugural season of the league as Montenegro's top-tier football competition. Although the league existed before, it was previously a second-tier league, underneath the Serbo-Montenegrin First League. Upon the independence of Montenegro, and the establishment of a Montenegrin Football Association, the league became disassociated with the Serbo-Montenegrin league and thus was given its present position.

The league played its first games of the season on 12 August 2006 and its final matches were played on 26 May 2007. On 26 May, after their final match, FK Zeta were confirmed as the league's first ever champions under the new FA, and thus qualified as the country's first ever UEFA Champions League competitor.

Teams

In order of their 2005-06 league table position, the inaugural members are:

From the former First League of Serbia and Montenegro
FK Zeta
FK Budućnost Podgorica
FK Jedinstvo

From the second-tier Montenegrin First League
FK Rudar Pljevlja
FK Sutjeska
FK Kom
FK Grbalj
FK Mogren
OFK Petrovac
FK Dečić

Promoted from the Montenegrin Second League
FK Berane
FK Mladost (Podgorica)

Stadia and locations

League table

Results
The schedule consists of three rounds. During the first two rounds, each team played each other once home and away for a total of 22 matches. The pairings of the third round will then be set according to the standings after the first two rounds, giving every team a third game against each opponent for a total of 33 games per team.

First and second round

Third round
Key numbers for pairing determination (number marks position after 22 games):

Relegation play-offs
The 10th placed team (against the 3rd placed team of the Second League) and the 11th placed team (against the 2nd placed team of the Second League) will both compete in two-legged relegation play-offs after the end of the season.

Summary

Matches

Jedinstvo won 5–1 on aggregate.

Dečić won 3–2 on aggregate.

Top scorers

References

External links
 Season on soccerway.com

Montenegrin First League seasons
Monte
1